Charlotte Buff (11 January 1753, Wetzlar – 16 January 1828, Hanover) was a youthful acquaintance of the poet Goethe, who fell in love with her. She rejected him and instead married Johann Christian Kestner, vice-archivist and privy councillor to the Hanoverian court. The character of Charlotte, in Goethe's novel The Sorrows of Young Werther, is partly based on her. Their relationship was characterized by heartiness and lack of constraint. Goethe bought the wedding rings for her and Kestner, in Frankfurt am Main. Charlotte and Kestner had four daughters and eight sons, among them August Kestner.

Appearances in modern culture
Within the 2010 German film Young Goethe in Love, the character of Charlotte Buff is portrayed by Miriam Stein.

References

External links

1753 births
1828 deaths
People from Wetzlar
Johann Wolfgang von Goethe
The Sorrows of Young Werther